Alfred Jackson may refer to:

Alfred E. Jackson (1807–1889), Confederate States Army brigadier general, American Civil War
Alfred Jackson (American football) (born 1955), professional American football player
Alfred Jackson (boxer) (1896–1980), British boxer at the 1928 Olympics
Alfred Jackson (gridiron football) (born 1967), professional American and Canadian football player
Alfred Jackson (cricketer) (1904–1982), Argentinian and Chilean cricketer
Alfred Metcalf Jackson (1860–1924), American politician
Alf Jackson (1887–1964), Australian rules footballer
Alfie Jackson, musician in The Holloways
Xavier Herbert (1901–1984), Australian writer born Alfred Jackson
Alfred Jackson (rugby league), New Zealand rugby league footballer who played in the 1900s and 1910s
Alfred Thomas Jackson (1864–1928), American educator
Clem Jackson (Alfred Clement Jackson, 1886–1960), English professional footballer